Coleraine is a large town in Northern Ireland.

Coleraine may also refer to:

Northern Ireland
Coleraine Academical Institution, a grammar school for boys
Coleraine Borough Council
Coleraine F.C., a football club
Coleraine barony
Coleraine (UK Parliament constituency), a former political district
The former County Coleraine, later abolished and replaced with County Londonderry
Coleraine Cheddar, a brand name of Dairy Produce Packers Ltd, and part of Kerry Group

Elsewhere
Coleraine, Victoria, Australia
Coleraine, Ontario, Canada - a community in Vaughan, Ontario
Saint-Joseph-de-Coleraine, Quebec, Canada - a municipality in southern Quebec
Coleraine, Minnesota, United States
Coleraine, Georgia (variously spelled "Colerain") -- extinct town in the U.S.state of Georgia.

See also
Colerain (disambiguation)
Colrain (disambiguation)